Stratford railway station is located on the Gippsland line in Victoria, Australia. It serves the town of Stratford, and opened on 8 November 1887.

History
When Stratford opened, it was a temporary terminus of the line from Stratford Junction, a few kilometres to the west. On 8 May 1888, the line was extended to Bairnsdale.

Major signalling changes occurred at the station in 1986, including the abolition of the electric staff sections Sale - Stratford Junction, and Stratford Junction - Stratford, which was replaced by the electric staff section Sale - Stratford, with an intermediate electric staff instrument provided at Stratford Junction. All signals and interlocking at Stratford Junction were also abolished during that time.

Under the Kennett government, V/Line passenger services to Stratford were suspended in August 1993. The passenger service was restored on 3 May 2004.

As part of the Regional Rail Revival project to upgrade the Gippsland line, a new railway bridge was built over the Avon River, south of the station. It replaced the previous bridge, dating from 1888, on which train speeds had been restricted to 10km/h for safety reasons. The new bridge was opened in December 2020.

Until their closure, Munro, Fernbank, Lindenow and Hillside stations were located between Stratford and Bairnsdale stations.

Platforms and services
Stratford has one platform and is served by V/Line Bairnsdale line trains.

Platform 1:
 services to Bairnsdale and Southern Cross

Gallery

References

External links

Victorian Railway Stations Gallery
Melway map

Railway stations in Australia opened in 1887
Regional railway stations in Victoria (Australia)
Transport in Gippsland (region)
Shire of Wellington